Alsunga (also Alšvanga) is a village in Alsunga Parish, Kuldīga Municipality in the Courland region of Latvia. Alsunga is the center of the Suiti, a small Catholic community in the Lutheran western part of Latvia. There are approximately 1345 inhabitants in Alsunga.

Alsunga was first mentioned in 1230, as an old settlement of Curonians with Curonian name and typical suffix -anga- (comp. Alšvanga, Palanga). In 1372, a castle was built for the vogt of Kuldīga komtur. In 1561 Alsunga became the part of the predominantly Lutheran Duchy of Courland and Semigallia. In 1567, the Saint Michael church was built. In 1623, the local landowner, Johan Ulrich von Schwerin, in order to marry a Catholic court lady Barbara Konarska from Vilnius, agreed to himself become Catholic. After the marriage he lived in Lithuania and Poland until 1632, when he returned to Alsunga after his father's death. In 1634, Johan Ulrich invited Jesuits to establish a mission in Alsunga to help him transfer all his peasants to Catholic faith.

On October 1, 2009, the Suiti cultural space was included in the UNESCO List of Intangible Cultural Heritage in Need of Urgent Safeguarding.

See also 
 Alsunga Castle

References

External links

Kuldīga Municipality
Towns and villages in Latvia
Aizpute County
Courland